Operation Lightning Strike can refer to:
 Operation Lightning Strike, a 2000 book sequel to 1999 novel Operation Thunder Child by Nick Pope
 Operation Lightning Strike, a 2015 Lithuanian army training exercise